Camaret Bay  is a small bay on the north coast of Brittany, France.

In 1694 it was the site of the battle of Camaret, a naval action between French and English forces, which culminated in a disastrous amphibious landing by the English as part of an attempt to seize the nearby port of Brest.

See also
 Camaret-sur-Mer
 Attack on Brest

Bays of Metropolitan France
Landforms of Finistère
Landforms of Brittany